The Triplicane Labbai Jamaath Mosque is a mosque located in the neighbourhood of Triplicane in Tamil Nadu, India. Constructed in 1889, major renovations have been planned.

References 

 

Mosques in Chennai
Mosques completed in 1889
Sunni mosques in India